U.S. Città di Palermo played the 2012–13 season in Serie A, the ninth consecutive season for the Sicilian club in the Italian top flight since their return to the league in 2004.

Review and events

After a disappointing end to its 2011–12 campaign (16th place, the worst in the club history since its 2004 Serie A return) Palermo parted ways with end-of-season boss Bortolo Mutti. In an attempt to provide a better structure for the club, Siena director of football Giorgio Perinetti was appointed as vice-president in charge of transfer matters, with Luca Cattani moved back to his previous role as scouting chief and Argentine manager Patricio Teubal (formerly a Mediaset employee) as marketing chief. Following Perinetti's appointment, many media sources strongly linked Siena head coach Giuseppe Sannino to the Palermo managerial vacancy. Sannino was officially announced as new head coach of Palermo on 6 June 2012. In addition, PUMA will replace Legea as main technical sponsor.

Regarding the club's summer market moves, the first signing already came in January as promising midfielder Nicolas Viola had immediately agreed a contract with the Rosanero but stayed on loan at Reggina for the remainder of the season. Later in April, chairman/owner Maurizio Zamparini announced to have acquired promising Argentine youngster Paulo Dybala, labelling him the "new Agüero." The move was however denied by Dybala's football agent, who declared that Palermo had not found a contract agreement with the player yet, despite having bought the player's transfer rights as confirmed by the Instituto board. Later in May, Zamparini announced also the signing of 18-year-old Uruguayan forward Sebastián Sosa from Cerro Largo FC. On 21 May 2012, FC Koper announced to have permanently sold midfielder Aljaž Struna to Palermo, thus becoming the fifth Slovene to move to Sicily in the last two years. On 6 June 2012, together with the announcement of new head coach Sannino, Palermo confirmed to have signed 33-year-old attacking midfielder/deep-lying forward Franco Brienza, formerly a Rosanero from 2000 to 2007, from Siena.

On 26 June 2012, Palermo announced the departure of youth coach and former playing hero Giovanni Tedesco, who left the club to pursue a head coaching career in the lower ranks of Italian football. The same day, the club also announced to have hired former Juventus and Napoli player Dario Baccin as new technical area coordinator for the club's youth system.

On 6 July 2012, Palermo confirmed to have reached an agreement for the transfer of Argentine defender Matías Silvestre on loan to Internazionale, with an option for the club to make the acquisition permanent by the end of the season. The first team roster started its preparation at the orders of coach Giuseppe Sannino on 12 July 2012 in Varese, and will move at the Venosta training camp four days later. Later the same day, striker Igor Budan was allowed to leave as his two-year-old daughter suddenly died in Croatia.

On 13 July 2012, Palermo supporters were awarded the Lega Serie A Fair-Play Trophy "Gaetano Scirea" for their sportsmanship behaviour in the last championship.

On 20 July 2012, incidentally also the tenth anniversary of Zamparini's reign as Palermo chairman, the club announced to have completed the signing of Argentine youngster Paulo Dybala.

On 23 July 2012, Palermo formalized the signing of Uruguayan international Egidio Arévalo Ríos from Club Tijuana in a three-year permanent deal.

In the first days of August, the club sold a number of first team players: on 1 August, Emiliano Viviano and Francesco Della Rocca were loaned to Fiorentina, whereas vice-captain and Italy international full-back Federico Balzaretti left Sicily after five years to sign a three-year contract with Roma. The following day, the club completed the transfer of Edgar Álvarez to Romanian side Dinamo București.

Later on 20 August, Palermo formalized and announced a deal that brought Swiss international Steve von Bergen in Sicily, in exchange for Alexandros Tzorvas (permanent) and youth team forward Daniel Jara Martínez (on loan). Palermo made a disappointing debut in the Serie A season, losing 0–3 to Napoli at home.

In the final day of the transfer window, Palermo also sold vice-captain and long-time rosanero Giulio Migliaccio to Fiorentina.

Palermo experienced a dismal start, with two 0–3 losses in a row (at home to Napoli, then away at Lazio) followed by a 1–1 home draw against Cagliari. These results led chairman Maurizio Zamparini to state he was "afraid of relegation", and persuaded him to remove Sannino from his coaching duties on 16 September 2012, and replace him with former Genoa and Inter boss Gian Piero Gasperini. Gasperini started his stint as Palermo coach with two consecutive defeats to Atalanta and Pescara; following that, chairman Zamparini shuffled the cards once again, announcing former Catania director of football Pietro Lo Monaco as new managing director and minority stakeholder, thus effectively replacing summer appointment Giorgio Perinetti and reducing his own role at Palermo; as a consequence, Perinetti tended his resignation days after these events. In the following game, Palermo trashed Chievo 4–1 at home thanks to a hat-trick from captain Fabrizio Miccoli (including a nationally praised volley goal from 45 metres), finally winning its first three points of the season. In the same game, Miccoli also marked the goal number 1,000 in the story of the club in the Italian top flight. Despite Gasperini's appointment, Palermo kept struggling in the league and found itself involved in the relegation battle. Palermo's second win under Gasperini came in a 2–0 home win against Sampdoria thanks to a brace from 18-year-old Paulo Dybala, who effectively replaced injured Miccoli by scoring his first goals in the Italian championship. The following home game saw Palermo trashing Catania 3–1 in the Sicilian derby, with a goal from Miccoli (the 100th of his Serie A career) followed by two from Iličić. However, this was followed by a string of four winless games in a row (one draw and three losses), the last of them being a 0–3 home loss at the hands of Fiorentina that left the Rosanero in 18th place by the end of the calendar year, thus in deep relegation zone.

As previously suggested by both chairman Zamparini and general manager Lo Monaco, who publicly announced their intention to sign at least one striker, a left back/left winger and a defender, Palermo decided to actively change the roster in the winter transfer window. The first signing, already announced in December, regarded Palermo-born experienced defender Salvatore Aronica, who joined from Napoli, in the same days the club completed the permanent sale of Nicolás Bertolo to Mexican club Cruz Azul. Another signing, Brazilian midfielder Anselmo, came then into effect as a co-ownership bid, in exchange for Eros Pisano, who moved to the other direction in another co-ownership deal. Days later, Palermo also announced the loan signing of Andrea Dossena from Napoli in an attempt to replace a vacancy created already in the summer by the departure of Federico Balzaretti to Roma. One more loan move was announced on 23 January, this being the signing of attacking midfielder Mauro Formica from English side Blackburn Rovers. This was preceded by a number of departures: Carlos Labrín left to move back to Huachipato and Eran Zahavi returned to his previous Israeli club, Maccabi Tel Aviv.

Other departures involved respected veteran striker Igor Budan, who moved to Atalanta on loan until the end of the season, and Luigi Giorgi, who also moved to Atalanta after Palermo opted to terminate the loan deal with Novara. Palermo also entered a long, well-publicized negotiation with Chievo regarding the services of 34-year-old goalkeeper Stefano Sorrentino to replace Ujkani, who was deemed as inexperienced by the club; after overcoming a number of obstacles, Palermo succeeded in completing the deal on 25 January, thus opening the doors for Ujkani's departure. Sorrentino promptly provided a man-of-the-match debut in a 1–1 draw at Cagliari, with Palermo suffering an injury-time equalizer to prevent the Rosanero from winning their first away game of the season.

The next day, on 28 January, Lo Monaco completed two more moves for Palermo, signing centre forward Mauro Boselli (on loan from Wigan Athletic) and right back/right winger Nélson from Real Betis. However, following disagreements with Zamparini, Lo Monaco resigned later in February and Perinetti was hired back to his previous role as director of football. Results did not improve, leaving Palermo in deep relegation zone and leading to a mutual consent contract termination between Gasperini and the club on 11 March, following a 1–2 home loss to Siena; one day later, Sannino was re-hired to attempt a desperate escape from relegation. Despite a number of positive results, including wins to Roma and Internazionale, Sannino did not however manage to bring the team out of the relegation zone and Palermo were relegated by the end of the season, thus marking an end to a nine-year stay to the top flight.

Confirmed summer transfer market bids
In

Out

Out on loan

Confirmed winter transfer market bids
In

Out

Out on loan

Current squad

Staff

Primavera

Match results

Legend

Pre-season friendlies

Serie A

The fixtures for the 2012–13 Serie A were announced on 26 July 2012. The season starts on Sunday 26 August 2012 with Palermo taking on Napoli at the Renzo Barbera, and ends Sunday 19 May 2013 with a match against Parma.

Matches

Kickoff times are in CET.

Results by round

Coppa Italia

Matches
Kickoff times are in CET.

Squad statistics

Top scorers
This includes all competitive matches.  The list is sorted by shirt number when total goals are equal.

References

2012-13
Italian football clubs 2012–13 season